Earl "Snakehips" Tucker (August 14, 1906 in Baltimore, Maryland - May 14, 1937 in New York City) was an American dancer and entertainer. Also known as the "Human Boa Constrictor", he acquired the nickname "snakehips" via the dance he popularized in Harlem in the 1920s called the "snakehips".

Career

Tucker frequented Harlem music clubs and was a regular at the Savoy Ballroom. He built his reputation by exhibiting his odd style of dance, which involved a great deal of hip motion. Tucker would make it appear that he was as flexible as a snake, and eventually, the dance became his calling card.  He became popular enough to eventually perform at Connie's Inn and the Cotton Club. The snakehips dates back to southern plantations before emancipation.

Riding this wave of popularity, in 1930 he appeared in Benny Rubin's 16-minute short film Crazy House, a comedic introduction to residents at the fictitious "Lame Brain Sanitarium".  Tucker's 2-minute dance number, performed in a shiny white shirt and shiny, baggy gold pants, displays his amazing dance innovations, his style a precursor to modern street and stage dance. His name appears in the opening credits only as "Snake Hips". In 1935, Tucker appeared in a short film called Symphony in Black: A Rhapsody of Negro Life.  The film was inspired by a Duke Ellington composition and included clips of Ellington composing, as well as Billie Holiday singing and Tucker doing the snakehips.

References

1906 births
1937 deaths
American male dancers
20th-century American dancers